Bruno Magalhães (born 10 July 1980) is a Portuguese rally driver. He is a regular competitor in the Intercontinental Rally Challenge, driving a Peugeot 207 S2000 for Peugeot Sport Portugal. He is a twice-podium finisher on the Rali Vinho da Madeira, finishing second in 2007 and second in 2009. He won the 2010 Rally Azores.

Results

Titles
 Triple Portugal Rally Championship all categories, 2007, 2008 and 2009 ;
 Portugues Champion Production : 2007 ;
 Portugues National Champion : 2008 and 2009 ;
 Peugeot 206 Throphy: 2004 ;

IRC victories 
 Rallye Açores : 2010

ERC victories 
 Rallye Açores : 2017
 Rali Vinho da Madeira : 2012
 Acropolis Rally : 2018

Portuguese Championship victories (23) 
 Rali Torrié : 2007, 2008, 2009 ;
 Rali Vinho da Madeira : 2007, 2008, 2009, 2011, 2012, 2013, 2014, 2015;
 Rali do Futebol Clube do Porto : 2007, 2008, and 2009 ;
 Rali Centro de Portugal : 2007, 2008, and 2009 ;
 Rali de Mortágua : 2007, 2008, and 2009 ;
 Rali de Algarve : 2007, 2009 and 2019 ;
 Rally de Portugal : 2007 (17th GC) and 2008 (6th GC);
 Rallye Açores : 2008, 2010, 2017
 Rallye do Marítimo : 2009.

IRC results

ERC results

References

1980 births
Portuguese rally drivers
Living people
World Rally Championship drivers
Intercontinental Rally Challenge drivers
European Rally Championship drivers

Peugeot Sport drivers